The shadow cabinet or shadow ministry is a feature of the Westminster system of government. It consists of a senior group of opposition spokespeople who, under the leadership of the Leader of the Opposition, form an alternative cabinet to that of the government, and whose members shadow or mirror the positions of each individual member of the Cabinet. Their areas of responsibility, in parallel with the ruling party's ministries, may be referred to as a shadow portfolio. Members of a shadow cabinet have no executive power. It is the shadow cabinet's responsibility to scrutinise the policies and actions of the government, as well as to offer alternative policies. The shadow cabinet makes up the majority of the Official Opposition frontbench, as part of frontbenchers to the parliament.

In most countries, a member of the shadow cabinet is referred to as a shadow minister. In the United Kingdom's House of Lords and in New Zealand, the term spokesperson is used instead of shadow. In Canada, the term opposition critic is also used.

Description and functions
The shadow ministers' duties may give them considerable prominence in the party caucus hierarchy especially if it is a high-profile portfolio. Although the salary and benefits paid from the public treasury to shadow ministers remain the same as for a backbencher—they have no executive responsibilities, unlike cabinet ministers—some opposition parties provide an additional stipend in addition to the salary they receive as legislators while many at least reimburse shadow ministers for any additional expenses incurred that are not otherwise eligible for reimbursement out of public funds. Moreover, in most Westminster-style legislative bodies all recognised parliamentary parties are granted a block of public funding to help their elected members carry out their duties, often in addition to the budgets individual legislators receive to pay for constituency offices and other such expenses. There is typically a stipulation that such funds must be used for official parliamentary business; however, within that restriction, parties can usually distribute the funds among their elected lawmakers as they see fit and thereby provide the money needed to staff and support shadow ministries.

Members of a shadow cabinet may not necessarily be appointed to the corresponding Cabinet post if and when their party forms a government, assuming that they retain their seats which by convention is usually considered a prerequisite to serve in the cabinet. However, the consistency with which parties assuming power appoint shadow ministers into the actual roles in government varies widely depending on such things as jurisdiction, the traditions and practices of the party assuming government, the exact circumstances surrounding their assumption of power and even the importance of the cabinet post in question.

As well as being potential future ministers, some shadow ministers have held ministerial posts in the past.

As a mark of discipline, shadow ministers are expected to speak within and not outside their portfolio areas.

Cultural applications
In the United Kingdom, Canada, New Zealand, and Australia, the major opposition party and specifically its shadow cabinet is called His (or Her) Majesty's Loyal Opposition. The adjective loyal is used because, while the role of the opposition is to oppose His Majesty's Government, it does not dispute the sovereign's right to the throne and therefore the legitimacy of the government. However, in other countries that use the Westminster system, the opposition is known simply as the parliamentary opposition.

Some parliamentary parties, notably the Australian Labor Party, elect all the members of their shadow cabinets in a party room ballot, with the Leader of the Opposition then allocating portfolios to the shadow ministers. In other parliamentary parties, the membership and composition of the Shadow Cabinet is generally determined solely by the Leader of the Opposition.

A related term is the shadow budget, which is often prepared by shadow cabinets (and, when released, usually presented by the shadow finance minister or equivalent) as an alternative to the real budget presented by the government. When prepared and released in an election year, an opposition party's shadow budget will typically form a key part of the party's manifesto, and will be largely if not wholly implemented if the opposition party subsequently forms a government (especially if it wins an outright majority).

Third parties
In many jurisdictions, third parties (who are neither participant in the government nor in the official opposition) may also form their own parliamentary front benches of spokespersons; however, parliamentary standing orders on the right of parties to speak often dictate that it can only be granted to a party or group if a minimum number of members can be recorded by the party. In Ireland, for example, technical groups are often formed by third parties and independent TDs in the Dáil Éireann in order to increase the members' right to speak against larger parties which can afford the right to speak as front benches in government or opposition.

Opposition parliamentary parties which are sufficiently small that they are about the same size as the government cabinet will often appoint all of their elected members to their shadow cabinet or equivalent, with third parties more likely compared to official opposition parties to use this sort of arrangement. If the parliamentary party is only slightly larger than the government's cabinet, its leadership potentially faces the awkward position of embarrassing a small minority of legislators by singling them out for exclusion from the shadow cabinet. On the other hand, incoming governments in the Westminster system often change the number and/or composition of ministries upon assuming office. Therefore, one solution to such an aforementioned issue when it occurs is to create nominal shadow "ministries" that correspond to currently nonexistent cabinet posts the party actually intends to create once in government. An opposition party can also employ this process in reverse by "merging" its shadow ministries to correspond to actual cabinet posts the opposition party wants to merge or otherwise eliminate.

Use outside English-speaking countries
While the practice of parliamentary shadow cabinets or frontbenches is not widespread in Germany, party leaders have often formed boards of experts and advisors ("teams of experts", or Kompetenzteam, in CDU/CSU and SPD parlance; alternate "top team", or Spitzenteam, in Bündnis '90/Die Grünen parlance).

In France, although the formation of a Shadow Cabinet is not compulsory and not common, several Shadow Cabinets have been formed.

In Hungary, a shadow cabinet under the leadership of Klára Dobrev was established by the strongest opposition party, the Democratic Coalition, for the first time, in 2022.

By country
 Australia
 Shadow cabinet of Australia (Liberal Party of Australia, Peter Dutton)
 List of state and territory shadow cabinets
 New South Wales
 New South Wales Shadow Cabinet (Australian Labor Party, Chris Minns)
 The Bahamas
 Shadow Cabinet (Progressive Liberal Party, Philip "Brave" Davis)
 Cameroon
 Shadow Cabinet (Social Democratic Front (SDF)
SDF Shadow Cabinet 
 Canada
 Official Opposition Shadow Cabinet of the 44th Parliament of Canada (Conservative Party of Canada, Pierre Poilievre)
 Ontario
 Official Opposition Shadow Cabinet of the 42nd Legislative Assembly of Ontario (New Democratic Party of Ontario, Peter Tabuns)
 France
 Shadow Cabinet of France
 Hungary
 Shadow Cabinet (Democratic Coalition, Klára Dobrev)
 Iran
 Shadow Cabinet (Saeed Jalili)
Ireland
 Opposition Front Bench (Sinn Féin, Mary Lou McDonald)
 Italy
 Shadow Cabinet of Italy (Governo ombra) (Walter Veltroni)
 Jamaica
 Shadow Cabinet of Jamaica (People's National Party)
 Japan
 Constitutional Democratic Party of Japan (Kenta Izumi)
 Lithuania
 Shadow Cabinet of Lithuania (Šešėlinis kabinetas) (Andrius Kubilius)''.
 Malaysia
 Shadow Cabinet of Malaysia (Perikatan Nasional, Hamzah Zainuddin)
 The Netherlands
 Den Uyl Shadow Cabinet (Labour Party, D'66, PPR, Joop den Uyl)
 New Zealand
 Shadow Cabinet of Christopher Luxon (New Zealand National Party, Christopher Luxon)
 Poland
 Shadow Cabinet (Civic Platform led by Grzegorz Schetyna)
 Serbia
 Shadow Cabinet (Democratic Party, Bojan Pajtić)
 Solomon Islands
 Shadow Cabinet (Democratic Party and allies)
 South Africa
 Official Opposition Shadow Cabinet (Democratic Alliance, John Steenhuisen)
 Sudan
 Sudanese Shadow Government (Official website, Wael Omer Abdin)
 Thailand
 Shadow Cabinet (Democrat Party, Abhisit Vejjajiva)
 Ukraine
 Shadow Government (Bloc of Yulia Tymoshenko, Arseniy Yatsenyuk)
 United Kingdom
 Official Opposition frontbench/Official Opposition Shadow Cabinet (Labour, Keir Starmer)
 Scotland
 Shadow Cabinet (Scottish Conservatives, Douglas Ross )
 Wales
 Shadow Cabinet (Welsh Conservatives, Andrew R. T. Davies )

See also
 
 
 Minority leader

References

Westminster system